Lara Breay is a feature film producer whose credits include Tropic Thunder, Penguins of Madagascar, Blades of Glory,  Megamind and Ron's Gone Wrong.

External links

The New York Times Movies

British film producers
Living people
Year of birth missing (living people)
Place of birth missing (living people)
21st-century British women